National Cancer Institute (some times Apeksha Hospital), widely known as the "Maharagama Cancer Hospital" is a government hospital in Maharagama, Sri Lanka. Is the main hospital which is dedicated for treating cancer .Which is under the control of Department of Health, provides all its services free of charge. In 2016 hospital open Haematopoietic Stem Cell Transplant (HSCT) unit. Its valued Rs. 1.2 billion. Present day Sri Lanka has more than 50,000 cancer patients.  Annually died 14,000 patient.

References 

Cancer hospitals
Central government hospitals in Sri Lanka
Hospitals in Colombo District
Teaching hospitals in Sri Lanka
Cancer In Sri Lanka